Hendrik Hermanus Franken (born 16 January 1987) is a Namibian rugby union player. He competed with the Namibian national team at the 2011 Rugby World Cup where he played in one match.

References

External links
ESPN Profile

1987 births
Living people
People from Stellenbosch
Namibian rugby union players
Namibia international rugby union players
Rugby union locks